Rubber plant is a common name for several plants and may refer to:

 Para rubber tree, a major commercial source of natural rubber
 Castilla elastica, a source of rubber for the ancient Maya people
 Ficus elastica, common ornamental plant